In Greek mythology, Leucippus (Ancient Greek: Λεύκιππος Leukippos, "white horse") was the eight king of Sicyon who reigned for 53 years.

Family 
Leucippus was the son and heir of King Thurimachus, son of Aegyrus, son of Thelxion, son of  Apis, son of Telchis, son of Europs, son of Aegialeus (an autochthon).

Mythology 
According to Pausanias' account, Leucippus had only one child, a daughter Calchinia. She bore Poseidon a son, Peratus, who was reared by Leucippus and inherited the kingdom. In some account, Leucippus was succeeded by Messapus as the ninth king of Sicyon.

Notes

References 

Pausanias, Description of Greece with an English Translation by W.H.S. Jones, Litt.D., and H.A. Ormerod, M.A., in 4 Volumes. Cambridge, MA, Harvard University Press; London, William Heinemann Ltd. 1918. . Online version at the Perseus Digital Library
Pausanias, Graeciae Descriptio. 3 vols. Leipzig, Teubner. 1903.  Greek text available at the Perseus Digital Library.

Princes in Greek mythology
Mythological kings of Sicyon
Kings in Greek mythology
Sicyonian characters in Greek mythology